Hemidactylus saba is a species of gecko. It is endemic to Yemen.

References

Hemidactylus
Reptiles described in 2011
Endemic fauna of Yemen
Reptiles of the Middle East